Beet distortion mosaic virus is a plant pathogenic virus.

External links
ICTVdB - The Universal Virus Database: Beet distortion mosaic virus
Family Groups - The Baltimore Method

Viral plant pathogens and diseases
Potyviruses